Burlington Township is a township in Burlington County, in the U.S. state of New Jersey. It is a suburb of Philadelphia and is part of the South Jersey region of the state. As of the 2020 United States census, the township's population was 23,983, its highest decennial count ever and an increase of 1,389 (+6.1%) from the 2010 census count of 22,594, which in turn reflected an increase of 2,300 (+11.3%) from the 20,294 counted in the 2000 census.

History 
Burlington was formed as a towne by the West Jersey proprietors and was interrelated to Burlington City during its early days. It was incorporated on February 21, 1798 by the Township Act of 1798, enacted by the New Jersey Legislature, as one of the initial group of 104 townships incorporated in New Jersey. Burlington City was reincorporated within the township as of March 14, 1851, at which time a portion of the township was annexed to the city. The township's name is a corruption of the English town of Bridlington.

Geography
According to the U.S. Census Bureau, Burlington township had a total area of 14.02 square miles (36.32 km2), including 13.45 square miles (34.83 km2) of land and 0.58 square miles (1.49 km2) of water (4.10%). Unincorporated communities, localities and place names located partially or completely within the township include Deacons, Fountain Woods, Springside and Stevens.

The township borders Burlington City, Edgewater Park, Florence Township, Springfield Township, Westampton Township and Willingboro Township in Burlington County; and both Bristol and Bristol Township across the Delaware River in Pennsylvania.

Demographics

2010 census

The Census Bureau's 2006–2010 American Community Survey showed that (in 2010 inflation-adjusted dollars) median household income was $83,291 (with a margin of error of +/− $4,419) and the median family income was $101,967 (+/− $6,626). Males had a median income of $60,587 (+/− $3,161) versus $50,078 (+/− $3,792) for females. The per capita income for the borough was $32,122 (+/− $1,352). About 3.0% of families and 5.6% of the population were below the poverty line, including 5.2% of those under age 18 and 6.9% of those age 65 or over.

2000 census
As of the 2000 census, there were 20,294 people, 7,112 households, and 5,277 families residing in the township. The racial makeup of the township was 67.71% White, 24.49% African American, 0.16% Native American, 3.73% Asian, 0.03% Pacific Islander, 1.46% from other races, and 2.41% from two or more races. Hispanic or Latino of any race were 4.01% of the population.

There were 7,112 households, out of which 40.1% had children under the age of 18 living with them, 59.0% were married couples living together, 11.2% had a female householder with no husband present, and 25.8% were non-families. 21.4% of all households were made up of individuals, and 6.4% had someone living alone who was 65 years of age or older. The average household size was 2.72 and the average family size was 3.18.

In the township, the population was spread out, with 27.2% under the age of 18, 5.6% from 18 to 24, 35.4% from 25 to 44, 19.2% from 45 to 64, and 12.6% who were 65 years of age or older. The median age was 36 years. For every 100 females, there were 90.1 males.  For every 100 females age 18 and over, there were 86.1 males.

The median income for a household in the township was $61,663, and the median income for a family was $70,958. Males had a median income of $49,290 versus $35,510 for females. The per capita income for the township was $24,754.  About 3.4% of families and 5.0% of the population were below the poverty line, including 4.7% of those under age 18 and 7.5% of those age 65 or over.

Economy
Burlington Coat Factory has its headquarters in the township, having relocated from Burlington City in 1988.

The mall closed its doors on January 8, 2018, though Sears remained while the rest of the mall was closed because it owned a section of mall property. Sears closed on September 2, 2018.

The township's businesses and shopping destinations cause the daytime population to rise to as much as 35,000, a jump of 50% from the resident population of almost 23,000.

Government

Local government 
Burlington Township is governed within the Faulkner Act, formally known as the Optional Municipal Charter Law, under the Mayor-Council (Plan E) form of municipal government, implemented based on the recommendations of a Charter Study Commission as of January 1, 1975. The township is one of 71 municipalities (of the 564) statewide that use this form of government. The governing body is comprised of the Mayor and the seven-member Township Council, all of whom are elected at-large in partisan elections to four-year terms in office on a staggered basis as part of the November general election. Either three or four council seats are up for vote in even-numbered years, with the mayoral seat up for vote during the same election where three council seats are on the ballot.

, the Mayor of Burlington Township is Democrat E.L. "Pete" Green, who was appointed to serve an unexpired term of office ending December 31, 2022. Members of the Burlington Township Council are Council President Robert W. Jung (D, 2024), President Pro Tem Patricia "Trish" Siboczy (D, 2024), Daniel Carducci (D, 2022; appointed to serve an unexpired term), Prabhdeep 'Pavi' Pandher (D, 2024; appointed to fill an unexpired term), Joyce R. Howell (D, 2022), George M. Kozub (D, 2022) and Carl M. Schoenborn (D, 2024).

In December 2021, the Township Council appointed Daniel Carducci to fill the seat expiring in December 2022 that became vacant following the resignation of Michael K. Cantwell earlier that month. In January 2022, the Township Council appointed E.L. "Pete" Green to fill the mayoral seat expiring in December 2022 that had been held by Brian J. Carlin until he resigned from office the previous month to take a seat as the Burlington County Surrogate, while Prabhdeep 'Pavi' Pandher was appointed to fill Green's Township Council seat expiring in 2024.

Federal, state, and county representation 
Burlington Township is located in the 3rd Congressional District and is part of New Jersey's 7th state legislative district.

 

Burlington County is governed by a Board of County Commissioners comprised of five members who are chosen at-large in partisan elections to serve three-year terms of office on a staggered basis, with either one or two seats coming up for election each year; at an annual reorganization meeting, the board selects a director and deputy director from among its members to serve a one-year term. , Burlington County's Commissioners are
Director Felicia Hopson (D, Willingboro Township, term as commissioner ends December 31, 2024; term as director ends 2023),
Deputy Director Tom Pullion (D, Edgewater Park, term as commissioner and as deputy director ends 2023),
Allison Eckel (D, Medford, 2025),
Daniel J. O'Connell (D, Delran Township, 2024) and 
Balvir Singh (D, Burlington Township, 2023). 
Burlington County's Constitutional Officers are
County Clerk Joanne Schwartz (R, Southampton Township, 2023)
Sheriff James H. Kostoplis (D, Bordentown, 2025) and 
Surrogate Brian J. Carlin (D, Burlington Township, 2026).

Politics
As of March 2011, there were a total of 13,214 registered voters in Burlington Township, of which 5,382 (40.7% vs. 33.3% countywide) were registered as Democrats, 2,160 (16.3% vs. 23.9%) were registered as Republicans and 5,664 (42.9% vs. 42.8%) were registered as Unaffiliated. There were 8 voters registered as Libertarians or Greens. Among the township's 2010 Census population, 58.5% (vs. 61.7% in Burlington County) were registered to vote, including 79.8% of those ages 18 and over (vs. 80.3% countywide).

In the 2012 presidential election, Democrat Barack Obama received 7,345 votes (68.4% vs. 58.1% countywide), ahead of Republican Mitt Romney with 3,229 votes (30.1% vs. 40.2%) and other candidates with 103 votes (1.0% vs. 1.0%), among the 10,744 ballots cast by the township's 14,146 registered voters, for a turnout of 76.0% (vs. 74.5% in Burlington County). In the 2008 presidential election, Democrat Barack Obama received 7,266 votes (65.3% vs. 58.4% countywide), ahead of Republican John McCain with 3,692 votes (33.2% vs. 39.9%) and other candidates with 99 votes (0.9% vs. 1.0%), among the 11,127 ballots cast by the township's 13,570 registered voters, for a turnout of 82.0% (vs. 80.0% in Burlington County). In the 2004 presidential election, Democrat John Kerry received 5,696 votes (57.4% vs. 52.9% countywide), ahead of Republican George W. Bush with 4,086 votes (41.1% vs. 46.0%) and other candidates with 72 votes (0.7% vs. 0.8%), among the 9,931 ballots cast by the township's 12,351 registered voters, for a turnout of 80.4% (vs. 78.8% in the whole county).

In the 2013 gubernatorial election, Republican Chris Christie received 3,486 votes (53.1% vs. 61.4% countywide), ahead of Democrat Barbara Buono with 2,874 votes (43.7% vs. 35.8%) and other candidates with 76 votes (1.2% vs. 1.2%), among the 6,570 ballots cast by the township's 14,162 registered voters, yielding a 46.4% turnout (vs. 44.5% in the county). In the 2009 gubernatorial election, Democrat Jon Corzine received 3,483 ballots cast (52.9% vs. 44.5% countywide), ahead of Republican Chris Christie with 2,669 votes (40.6% vs. 47.7%), Independent Chris Daggett with 283 votes (4.3% vs. 4.8%) and other candidates with 90 votes (1.4% vs. 1.2%), among the 6,578 ballots cast by the township's 13,512 registered voters, yielding a 48.7% turnout (vs. 44.9% in the county).

Education 

Public school students in pre-kindergarten through twelfth grade are educated in the Burlington Township School District, under superintendent Mary Ann Bell. As of the 2021–22 school year, the district, comprised of four schools, had an enrollment of 3,625 students and 328.8 classroom teachers (on an FTE basis), for a student–teacher ratio of 11.0:1. Schools in the district (with 2021–22 enrollment data from the National Center for Education Statistics) are 
B. Bernice Young Elementary School with 763 students in Pre-K to 1st grade, 
Fountain Woods Elementary School with 789 students in grades 2-5, 
Burlington Township Middle School at Springside with 843 students in grades 6-8 and 
Burlington Township High School with 1,187 students in grades 9-12.

Burlington Township School District received notice in 2009 after a video posted on YouTube by a parent without school approval showed more than a dozen children at B. Bernice Young Elementary School singing a song praising President Barack Obama, which Conservative groups cited as a means of indoctrinating students to support the President. At the conclusion of the song, the children pump their fists and chant "hip, hip, hooray!" The song had been performed in conjunction with Black History Month activities and when the author of the book I Am Barack Obama visited the school the next month

Students from Burlington Township, and from all of Burlington County, are eligible to attend the Burlington County Institute of Technology, a countywide public school district that serves the vocational and technical education needs of students at the high school and post-secondary level at its campuses in Medford and Westampton Township.

Sports
In 2017, the 10U Cal Ripken baseball team from Burlington Township represented the Mid-Atlantic Region in the 10U Cal Ripken World Series, held in Hammond, Indiana.

Transportation

Roads and highways

While there is no turnpike interchange within the township's borders, it is accessible in neighboring Florence Township (at Exit 6A on the Pennsylvania Extension) and Westampton Township (at Interchange 5, which is signed for Burlington-Mount Holly).

Other roads that pass through Burlington Township include U.S. Route 130, Interstate 295, and County Road 541.

Public transportation
NJ Transit provides bus service in the city between Trenton and Philadelphia on the 409 route and between Burlington and Camden on the 413 and 419 routes.

The NJ Transit River Line light rail system provides transportation between the Trenton Transit Center in Trenton and the Walter Rand Transportation Center (and other stations) in Camden, with stops in Burlington City at Burlington South and Burlington Towne Centre, but not in Burlington Township itself.

Notable people

People who were born in, residents of, or otherwise closely associated with Burlington Township include:
 Kevin Baggett (born 1966), head coach of the Rider University men's basketball team
 Breland (born 1995), country singer/songwriter
 Thomas P. Foy (1951–2004), member of the New Jersey General Assembly and New Jersey Senate whose start in politics was on the Burlington Township Council
 Peter Hill (1767–1820), former slave who was the first African American clockmaker
 Ka'dar Hollman (born 1994), American football cornerback who has played in the NFL for the Green Bay Packers
 Sybilla Righton Masters (–1720), inventor who was the first person residing in the American colonies to be given an English patent, which was issued in 1715 in her husband's name, as women were not allowed to have their own patents
 Balvir Singh, politician elected to the Burlington County Board of Chosen Freeholders in 2017, who is the first Asian-American to win a countywide election in the county and the first Sikh-American to win a countywide election in New Jersey
 Rod Streater (born 1988), wide receiver who played in the NFL for the Cleveland Browns
 Bryan Warrick (born 1959), former professional basketball player who played five seasons in the NBA

References

External links

Burlington Township website

 
1798 establishments in New Jersey
Faulkner Act (mayor–council)
New Jersey populated places on the Delaware River
Townships in Burlington County, New Jersey
Populated places established in 1798